Seymour Reid (12 July 1914 – 13 January 2004) was a South African cricketer. He played in five first-class matches for Border in 1946/47 and 1947/48.

See also
 List of Border representative cricketers

References

External links
 

1914 births
2004 deaths
South African cricketers
Border cricketers